The timeline of wars has been split up in the following periods:

 List of wars: before 1000
 List of wars: 1000–1499
 List of wars: 1500–1799
 List of wars: 1800–1899
 List of wars: 1900–1944
 List of wars: 1945–1989
 List of wars: 1990–2002
 List of wars: 2003–present

See also
 List of wars by death toll
 :Category:Possible future wars

External links
 An Interactive map of all the battles fought around the world in the last 4,000 years
 Timeline of wars on Histropedia
 Information on 1,500 conflicts since 1800 (archived 20 June 2019]